The Morocco women's national football team has qualified to the FIFA Women's World Cup in one occasion, the 2023 FIFA Women's World Cup which will also be the country's debut. Morocco is also the first country from the Arab world to do so since the inception of the FIFA Women's World Cup in 1991.

FIFA Women's World Cup results

*Draws include knockout matches decided on penalty kicks.

Participation

2023 Women's World Cup in Australia/New Zealand

References

 
World Cup
Countries at the FIFA Women's World Cup